The Lafayette Theatre (1912–1951), known locally as "the House Beautiful", was one of the most famous theaters in Harlem. It was an entertainment venue located at 132nd Street and 7th Avenue in Harlem, New York. The structure was demolished in 2013.

Early years
The Lafayette Theatre was a 1,500-seat two-story theater built by banker Meyer Jarmulowsky that opened on November, 1912. Located at 132nd Street and 7th Avenue, it was designed in the Renaissance style by architect Victor Hugo Koehler, who also designed the two three-story buildings flanking the theater on the corners of 131st and 132nd Streets.  

In 1913 the Lafayette became the first major theater to desegregate. African-American theatergoers were allowed to sit in orchestra seats instead of the balcony, to which they were relegated in other New York theaters.  The Lafayette Players, the resident stock company, played before almost exclusively African-American audiences both in plays from white theater repertory and in the classics. The theater presented such Broadway hits as Madame X and Dr. Jekyll and Mr. Hyde. The show that became known as Darktown Follies was staged in 1913 helping popularize at least two dances and helping bring white theatergoers uptown.

Management 
Arts critic, producer and Broadway composer Lester Walton worked as manager and dramatic lyricist for the theater from 1914 to 1916 and from 1919 to 1921.

From 1916–1919, the theatre was managed by Quality Amusement, an entertainment business owned by producer Robert Levy. The theater drew large audiences of both Blacks and whites with his sophisticated productions and groundbreaking work with Black actors.

Jazz performers 

In 1923, Duke Ellington made his New York debut while performing in Wilbur Sweatman's band at the Lafayette, and later performed with his own group at the venue. This was all due to producer/director Leonard Harper who Ellington lived with as a boarder in his larger Harlem apartment at the time. Ellington and his orchestra also appeared at the Lafayette in October 1927 with the singer Adelaide Hall in the show Jazz Mania. It was in this show that the song Creole Love Call was a first introduced to the public.  Other jazz musicians who performed at the Lafayette include Fletcher Henderson, Bennie Moten, Chick Webb, and Zutty Singleton. Harlem Renaissance playwright Eulalie Spence's play On Being Forty premiered at the Lafayette Theatre on October 15, 1924. Although the play was never published, the Lafayette performance was reviewed by George S. Schuyler, providing all that is presently known about the play, as no extant copies have been found. Schuyler would later become known as "the most prominent African American journalist and essayist of the early twentieth century."

Federal Theatre Project 
The Lafayette Theatre reached the height of its fame with the Voodoo Macbeth, a production of Shakespeare's Macbeth, adapted and staged by Orson Welles that ran April 14–June 20, 1936. This show had an all African-American cast. It was a production of the Federal Theatre Project which was part of the Works Project Administration. The overture was by James P. Johnson and such notable actors as Canada Lee and Rose McClendon were part of the program. The production was universally known in advance as the "Voodoo Macbeth" because the setting was changed from Scotland to a fictional Caribbean island based on Haiti, and acquired its nickname due to its use of voodoo imagery in place of the witchcraft in the original play.

In 1951 the building was acquired by Williams Institutional Christian Methodist Episcopal Church. The original facade was replaced in 1990, to the distress of advocates of historic preservation.

The building was demolished in 2013, replaced by an eight-story apartment building called the Lafayette.

WPA Federal Theatre posters 
(Selection was limited by availability.)

Opening night at the WPA's Voodoo Macbeth, 1936 
(Selection was limited by availability.)

References

Bibliography 
Cullen, Frank; with Hackman, Florence; and  McNeilly, Donald. "Lafayette Theatre in Harlem", Vaudeville Old & New: An Encyclopedia of Variety Performers in America (New York: Routledge Taylor & Francis Group, 2007):643
Dunlap, David W. "Williams Institutional C. M. E. Church", From Abyssinian to Zion (New York: Columbia University Press, 2004):294}}

External links

Google Street View: the church in 2011
New York City Department of Records (Municipal Archives) "2225-27 Adam C Powell Blvd" (photo from 1983-1988, showing theater facade)
Movie Theaters Designed by Victor Hugo Koehler.
Stuart A. Rose Manuscript, Archives, and Rare Book Library, Emory University: New Lafayette Theatre collection, 1968-2008

Theatres completed in 1912
1912 establishments in New York City
Buildings and structures demolished in 2013
Former theatres in Manhattan
Demolished theatres in New York City
Demolished buildings and structures in Manhattan
Harlem
Harlem Renaissance
2013 disestablishments in New York (state)
Federal Theatre Project